Stepan Meliksetovich Aghajanian (16 December 1863 – 13 December 1940) was an Armenian painter; known primarily for portraits and landscapes.

Biography
He was born in Shusha. His father was a tailor. Following that, he moved to Baku then, in 1886, left to study in France. 

He initially studied art in Marseille (1886–1890). Later, he went to Paris, where he entered the Académie Julian. He was there from 1897 to 1900, studying with Jean-Paul Laurens and Jean-Joseph Benjamin-Constant.

In 1900, he returned to Shusha, then worked in Baku from 1902 to 1904. Finally, he settled in Rostov-on-Don, where he taught painting in the public schools until 1921. 

He returned to Armenia in 1921, at the beginning of the Russian Civil War. After 1929, he worked as a teacher at the Art Industrial College (now the ]). He was awarded the title of People's Artist of the Armenian SSR. The following year, he was presented with the Order of the Red Banner of Labour. He died in  1940 in Yerevan.

Sources
Stepan Aghajanian @ the Great Soviet Encyclopedia
Brief biography @ Арт-Рисунок
John Milner. A Dictionary of Russian and Soviet Artists, 1420 – 1970. Woodbridge, Suffolk; Antique Collectors' Club, 1993

Further reading
 Paravon Mirzoyan, Stepan Aghajanian 150, 1863-1940, Edit Print, 2013

External links

1863 births
1940 deaths
19th-century Armenian painters
20th-century Armenian painters
Artists from Shusha
Recipients of the Order of the Red Banner of Labour
Armenian portrait painters
Soviet painters